Culmer station is a station on the Metrorail rapid transit system just northeast of the Spring Garden neighborhood of Miami, Florida, near the Midtown Interchange. This station is located at the intersection of Northwest 11th Street and Seventh Avenue (US 441), opening to service December 17, 1984. The station is named after Father John Culmer, a local civil rights leader who labored tirelessly to improve the living conditions of black Miamians.

Station layout
The station has two tracks served by an island platform, with a parking lot south of the platform and bus bays north of it.

Places of interest
Spring Garden
LoanDepot Park
Historic Booker T. Washington Senior High School
Northwest Seventh Avenue (US 441/State Road 7)

References

External links

MDT – Metrorail Stations
 11th Street entrance from Google Maps Street View

Green Line (Metrorail)
Orange Line (Metrorail)
Metrorail (Miami-Dade County) stations in Miami
Railway stations in the United States opened in 1984
1984 establishments in Florida